Sisters of Eve is a 1928 American silent mystery film directed by Scott Pembroke and starring Anita Stewart, Betty Blythe and Creighton Hale. It is based on the 1911 novel The Temptation of Tavernake by E. Phillips Oppenheim.

Cast
 Anita Stewart as Beatrice Franklin
 Betty Blythe as Mrs. Wenham Gardner
 Creighton Hale as Leonard Tavernake
 Harold Nelson as Prof. Franklin
 Francis Ford as Pritchard
 Charles King as Wenam Gardner/Jerry Gardner
 Mae Busch

References

Bibliography
 Goble, Alan. The Complete Index to Literary Sources in Film. Walter de Gruyter, 1999.

External links
 

1928 films
1928 mystery films
American silent feature films
American mystery films
American black-and-white films
Films directed by Scott Pembroke
Rayart Pictures films
Films based on British novels
1920s English-language films
1920s American films
Silent mystery films